Kakataibo may refer to:
 Kakataibo people, an ethic group of Peru
 Kakataibo language, their language

Language and nationality disambiguation pages